Tricholoma bakamatsutake is a mushroom of the agaric genus Tricholoma. Found in China and Japan, it was described as new to science by mycologist Tsuguo Hongo in 1974. It is closely related to the pine mushroom, Tricholoma matsutake, but occurs in Fagaceae forests (beeches and oaks) rather than pine forests.

See also
List of Tricholoma species
Baka (Japanese word)

References

bakamatsutake
Edible fungi
Fungi described in 1974
Fungi of China
Fungi of Japan